"Merry" is a song by American power pop band Magnapop. It was initially released in 1990 as the B-side to a 7" through Safety Net Records (catalogue number NET 17) under the band's original name of Homemade Sister. The song was re-recorded and released again on the EP Sugarland as well as the band's self-titled debut album in 1992 on Solid Records (527.9013.40.)

A live acoustic recording of the song from June 7, 1992, was released on the EP Big Bright Cherry as well as the special edition of the studio album Hot Boxing. A new studio recording of it appears on the 2019 album The Circle Is Round.

NME described the second recording as "a sublime piece of pop supremacy" and James Sullivan, writing for Addicted to Noise in 1996 declared it one of the group's finest songs.

Track listing
All songs written by Linda Hopper and Ruthie Morris
1990 release
"Rip the Wreck" – 2:45
"Merry" – 2:27

1992 release
"Merry" – 3:05
"Complicated" – 1:53

Personnel
Magnapop
Linda Hopper – lead vocals
David McNair – drums
Ruthie Morris – lead guitar
Shannon Mulvaney – bass guitar

Production staff
Bill Ashton – engineering (original release)
Ed Burdell – production (original release)
Cathy Carmichael – photography (original release)
Michael Stipe – production (later release)
Gina Tackett – photography (original release)

References

External links
"Merry" at Discogs

1992 singles
1990 debut singles
Magnapop songs
Song recordings produced by Michael Stipe
Songs written by Ruthie Morris
Songs written by Linda Hopper
Safety Net Records singles
1990 songs